Atanu Chakraborty is at present the Chairperson of HDFC Bank, India's largest lender by market capitalization, appointed by the Reserve Bank of India in April 2021.  He is a 1985 batch officer of the Indian Administrative Service, of the Gujarat cadre, and has served as Economic Affairs Secretary of India till his retirement in April 2020. 

In the Ministry of Finance (India), he also served as the Secretary of Expenditure as well as the Secretary of Department of Investment and Public Asset Management (DIPAM).  He was also appointed on the Central Board of Directors of the Reserve Bank of India. 

He has also held various posts under the Government of India and State Government of Gujarat.

Education 
He holds a degree in Electronics and Communication engineering. He has done his post-graduate diploma in business finance and an MBA from the United Kingdom.

Career 
Atanu Chakraborty has served various positions for both the Government of India and the Government of Gujarat. He has help positions in the Ministries of Finance, Ports, industries, labour, petroleum and natural gas, and Home. He also served on Boards of state-owned enterprises. 

In the Government of Gujarat served as the Additional Chief Secretary of Industriesand Principal Secretary of the Finance Department.
He served as Chief Executive of GSPC Group of companies, GSFC Limited, GSFS Limited, CEO of Gujarat Maritime Board. He served as Chief Executive Officer of Gujarat Infrastructure Development Board.
He served as Chairperson of National Infrastructure and Investment Fund (NIIF)
He also served as Ministry of Finance, Government of India and held the posts of Secretary, DIPAM, and Secretary, Department of Economic Affairs.

Economic Affairs Secretary 
Chakraborty was appointed as the Union Economic Affairs Secretary by the Appointments Committee of the Cabinet (ACC) in July 2019. He was succeeded by Subhash Chandra Garg. 

In October 2019, the Appointments Committee of the Cabinet given him additional charge of department of expenditure and was made Expenditure Secretary. 

He was the core team that prepared the Union Budget for 2020 and also was instrumental in the preparation of the National Infrastructure Pipeline.  He was also the chairman of National Infrastructure Investment Fund.

DIPAM Secretary 
He has served as the secretary of the Department of Investment and Public Asset Management (DIPAM) in the Ministry of Finance (India). As a secretary of the Department of Investment and Public Asset Management (DIPAM),  Atanu directly handled the disinvestment of state-owned enterprises. He has played a key role in garnering 80,000 crore through disinvestment proceedings in the year 2018-19 after he took charge as the secretary of the department in May 2018.

Director General of DGH 
Prior to that he has served as the Director General of Directorate General of Hydrocarbons (DGH) in the Ministry of Petroleum from February 2016. He held the rank of Additional Secretary as the DG of DGH.  While in DGH he launched the Open Acreage Licensing Policy and the National Data Repository.

MD of Gujarat State Petroleum Corporation 
He also served as the MD of Gujarat State Petroleum Corporation, an oil & gas company promoted by the State Government with operations in E&P, Gas Transmission and Distribution and Gas Trading.

Gujarat State Financial Services 
In his home state, he served as Managing Director of Gujarat State Financial Services Ltd. He served as Managing Director of Gujarat State Fertilizer & Chemicals (GSFC)   Ltd. He was also the CEO of Gujarat Infrastructure Development Board.

References 

Indian Administrative Service officers
Living people
Year of birth missing (living people)